Thomas H. Skemp (August 25, 1897 – May 22, 1977) was an American football, basketball, and baseball coach, college athletics administrator, and lawyer. He served as the head football coach at Saint Mary's College—now known as Saint Mary's University of Minnesota—in Winona, Minnesota from 1919 to 1932, compiling a record of 49–42–5. Skemp was also the head basketball coach at Saint Mary's from 1919 to 1928, amassing a record of 27–73, and the school's head baseball coach from 1924 to 1928, tallying a mark of 4–17.

Skemp was born on August 25, 1897, in La Crosse, Wisconsin. He graduated from La Crosse Central High School in 1913 and then attended La Crosse State Normal School—now known as University of Wisconsin–La Crosse, where he played college football before graduating in 1915.

Skemp began a law practice in La Crosse in 1928 and formed a partnership with Quincy Hale in 1936. He died on May 22, 1977, in La Crosse.

Head coaching record

Football

References

1897 births
1977 deaths
Saint Mary's Cardinals athletic directors
Saint Mary's Cardinals baseball coaches
Saint Mary's Redmen football coaches
Saint Mary's Cardinals men's basketball coaches
Wisconsin–La Crosse Eagles football players
Sportspeople from La Crosse, Wisconsin
Wisconsin lawyers
Wisconsin Republicans
Coaches of American football from Wisconsin
Players of American football from Wisconsin
Baseball coaches from Wisconsin
Basketball coaches from Wisconsin
20th-century American lawyers
La Crosse Central High School alumni